The Sioux City Open was a PGA Tour event that was played for three years in the 1950s in Sioux City, Iowa, U.S. It was held at the Sioux City Boat Club, which was renamed the Two Rivers Golf Club in 1991.

The inaugural event was won by Jack Burke Jr. with a score of 65-68-65-70 (268), after a final day battle with Sam Snead. The winner's check was $2,600 out of a total purse of $15,000. Al Besselink had his first PGA Tour win at the final event.

Winners

References

Former PGA Tour events
Golf in Iowa
Recurring sporting events established in 1950
Recurring sporting events disestablished in 1952
1950 establishments in Iowa
1952 disestablishments in Iowa